Aremonia agrimonoides, commonly known as bastard-agrimony, is a herbaceous flowering plant in the rose family, Rosaceae.

See also 
 Agrimonia (the genus of true agrimony)
 Eupatorium cannabinum (hemp agrimony)

References

Agrimoniinae